James Giles Beadle (born 16 July 2004) is an English professional footballer who plays as a goalkeeper for EFL League Two side Crewe Alexandra, on loan from Brighton & Hove Albion of the Premier League.

Club career
After playing youth football for Charlton Athletic and Brighton & Hove Albion, Beadle moved on loan to Crewe Alexandra from Brighton in January 2023. He made his senior debut, keeping a clean sheet, in Crewe's goalless draw at Walsall on 21 February 2023.

International career
Beadle has played for England at under-15, under-16 and under-18 youth levels. In September 2022 he represented the under-19 team in qualifying games.

Career statistics

References

2004 births
Living people
English footballers
Association football goalkeepers
England youth international footballers
English Football League players
Charlton Athletic F.C. players
Brighton & Hove Albion F.C. players
Crewe Alexandra F.C. players